Hugh Nigel Kennedy  (born 22 October 1947) is a British medieval historian and academic. He specialises in the history of the early Islamic Middle East, Muslim Iberia and the Crusades. From 1997 to 2007, he was Professor of Middle Eastern History at the University of St Andrews. Since 2007, he has been Professor of Arabic at SOAS, University of London.

Early life
Kennedy was born on 22 October 1947 in Hythe, Kent, England. He spent a year 1965-6 studying at the Middle East Centre for Arab Studies at Shemlan in Lebanon; he had received a scholarship from the British Foreign Office. From 1966 to 1969, he studied at Pembroke College, Cambridge. He studied Arabic and Persian for Part 1 of the Tripos (achieving a 2:1), and history for Part II (achieving a first). He graduated from the University of Cambridge with a Bachelor of Arts (BA) degree in 1969. From 1969 to 1972, he was a postgraduate student within the Faculty of Oriental Studies, University of Cambridge. He completed his Doctor of Philosophy (PhD) degree in 1978 with a doctoral thesis titled Politics and the political élite in the early Abbasid Caliphate.

Academic career
In 1972, Kennedy joined the University of St Andrews as a Lecturer in Mediaeval History. He was promoted to Reader in 1990. He was appointed Professor of Middle Eastern History in 1997. He held a number of academic administration appointments at St Andrews: he was Deputy Head of the School of History from 1992 to 1998, and was Dean of the Faculty of Arts from 1995 to 1998.

In 2007, he left the University of St Andrews to join the School of Oriental and African Studies (SOAS), University of London. He was appointed Professor of Arabic at SOAS. From January 2015 to January 2018, he is leading a project at SOAS titled Economic integration and social change in the Islamic world system, 800-1000CE; it is being funded by the Leverhulme Trust.

Among his research topics is the History of the Islamic Middle East, Islamic Archaeology and Muslim Iberia.

Personal life
In 1970, Kennedy married Hilary Wybar. Together they have had four children; one son and three daughters. One of their daughters has pre-deceased her parents.

Honours
In 2000, Kennedy was elected a Fellow of the Royal Society of Edinburgh (FRSE). In July 2012, he was elected a Fellow of the British Academy (FBA). He is also a Fellow of the Royal Asiatic Society (FRAS).

Bibliography 
1981, The Early Abbasid Caliphate; a Political History (Barnes and Noble, London and New York).
1986, The Prophet and the Age of the Caliphates, 600–1050 (London, Longman)
1990, Al-Mansur and al-Mahdi; being an annotated translation of vol. xxix of the History of al-Tabari (Albany, State University of New York Press)
1994, Crusader Castles (Cambridge, Cambridge University Press)
1996, Muslim Spain and Portugal: a political history of al–Andalus (London, Longman)
1998, Egypt as a Province in the Islamic Caliphate, 641–868 // The Cambridge History of Egypt: Vol. 1: Islamic Egypt / edited by Carl F. Petry (Cambridge, Cambridge University Press) 
2001, The Armies of the Caliphs: military and society in the early Islamic State (London, Routledge)
2001, Revised ed. of Crusader Castles (Cambridge, Cambridge University Press)
2003, Mongols, Huns and Vikings: Nomads at War (London, Cassell)
2004, The Court of the Caliphs (London, Weidenfeld and Nicolson)
2006, The Byzantine and Early Islamic Near East (Variorum Collected Studies Series) (Farnham, Ashgate Publishing Limited)
2004, Revised ed. of Prophet and the Age of the Caliphates, 600–1050 (Harlow, Longman)
2005, When Baghdad Ruled the Muslim World: The Rise and Fall of Islam's Greatest Dynasty (Cambridge, MA, Da Capo Press)
2007, The Great Arab Conquests. How the Spread of Islam Changed the World We Live In. (London, Weidenfeld and Nicolson)
2008, The Muslims in Europe // The New Cambridge Medieval History: Vol. 2: c.700 — c.900 (Second ed.) / edited by Rosamond McKitterick (Cambridge, Cambridge University Press) 
2010, The Late ʿAbbasid Pattern, 945–1050 // The New Cambridge History of Islam: Vol. 1: The Formation of the Islamic World, Sixth to Eleventh Centuries / edited by Chase F. Robinson (Cambridge, Cambridge University Press) 
2013, Warfare and Poetry in the Middle East (London, Bloomsbury Publishing) 
2013, Crisis and Continuity at the Abbasid Court, with Maaike van Berkel, Nadia Maria El Cheikh and Letizia Osti (Leiden, Brill Publishers) 
2016, Caliphate: The History of an Idea. (New York, Basic Books) 
2016, The Caliphate: A Pelican Introduction. (London, Penguin)
2020, The Rise and Fall of the Early ʿAbbāsid Political and Military Elite // Transregional and Regional Elites – Connecting the Early Islamic Empire (Studies in the History and Culture of the Middle East, vol. 36) / edited by Hannah-Lena Hagemann, Stefan Heidemann (Berlin, Walter de Gruyter GmbH & Co KG)

References 

1947 births
Living people
People from Hythe, Kent
Alumni of Pembroke College, Cambridge
Historians of the Crusades
Scholars of medieval Islamic history
Academics of the University of St Andrews
Academics of SOAS University of London
Fellows of the Royal Society of Edinburgh
Fellows of the British Academy
Fellows of the Royal Asiatic Society